Jazzamor is a German musical duo which consists of Bettina Steingass (née Bettina Mischke) and Roland Grosch. Their music combines elements of lounge music, jazz and bossa nova.

Discography

Albums
Lazy Sunday Afternoon (2003 · Blue Flame Records)
A Piece of my Heart (2004 · Blue Flame Records)
Travel... (2006 · Blue Flame Records)
Beautiful Day (2007 · Blue Flame Records)
Selection – Songs for a Beautiful Day (2008 · Blue Flame Records/Rough Trade)
Lucent Touch (2011 · Blue Flame Records/Rough Trade)
Strange to be in Paradise (2017 · Blue Flame Records)
Songs of a Silent Summer (2020 · Blue Flame Records)

External links
 Official site
 Jazzamor at Discogs
 Jazzamor on Myspace
 Jazzamor at Last.fm

German musical groups